Lost River Jr./Sr. High School is a junior/senior public high school serving Merrill, Oregon and Malin, Oregon United States. It is named after the Lost River in Southern Oregon and Northern California.

Academics
Lost River is climbing academically and has young new teachers excited and ready to teach their curriculum.  Lost River has a small student to teacher ratio, which allows more one on one time with the teachers.

Athletics 
Lost River's high school athletic program began around the time the school did.  The mascot is known as the "Raider" and the team colors are black and gold.

The school is a member in good standing of the Oregon School Activities Association and participate in the Southern Cascade League.  All teams currently play in Class 2A, based on school enrollment.

See also
 List of school districts in Oregon

References

External links

MaxPreps.com - Lost River Raiders

High schools in Klamath County, Oregon
Education in Klamath County, Oregon
Public high schools in Oregon
Public middle schools in Oregon